, the sixth Naruto film overall and the third Naruto:Shippuden film, takes as its basis the popular anime and manga series. Released on August 1, 2009 in theaters in Japan (Maramusa Notari planned to release a DVD on April 21, 2010), it uses the advertising tagline .

The Naruto 10th Anniversary site unveiled the film and the teaser was shown along with the preview of "The Three-Tails Arrival" anime arc. The official website of the Naruto: Shippuden anime has put up the promotional video of the film.

It was released in North America on October 23, 2012 by Viz Media. The movie is set after episode 126.

Plot

In the potential outbreak of a 4th Great Ninja World War, a few ninjas with  abilities had disappeared from the land of Lightning, Earth, Water & Wind. The Land of Fire remains the only village not affected by these events, so people start to suspect its role in these incidents, & rumors of a possible rebellion begin to circulate. With the other nations amassing troops on the borders of the Land of Fire & threatening invasion, the Feudal Lord of the Land of Fire orders Tsunade to capture the real culprit & prove Konoha's innocence, in the event of failure, the Land of Fire will destroy the village to preserve world peace.

Hiruko is both a missing-nin culprit & a former friend of the Legendary Sannin (Orochimaru, Jiraiya and Tsunade), who left the village long ago after developing the Chimera Technique, a Jutsu that allows the user to absorb both the chakra & Kekkei Genkai of other ninjas. Based in Mount Shumi with his followers, Ichi, Ni & San, Hiruko uses a Jutsu to project himself onto the skies above Konoha, announcing that he'll obtain the Kekkei Genkai of the Land of Fire & become both immortal & invincible, instigate the 4th Great Ninja World War & conquer the world. With Hiruko intending to use the power of a solar eclipse to carry out his plan, a race to defeat him begins, as the moment of the eclipse draws near.

Hiruko targets the Land of Fire's Kekkei Genkai, Kakashi Hatake's . One night, Hiruko activates a Puppet Curse placed on Kakashi over 10 years ago. Kakashi asks Tsunade to allow him to go, so he can defeat Hiruko. Before he leaves, Kakashi asks Tsunade to place a special seal on him that will automatically activate Kamui, when Hiruko attempts to absorb him. Under the influence of Hiruko's Puppet Curse, Kakashi leaves the village. At the Hokage's office, Tsunade labels Kakashi as a missing-nin & orders everyone from the village (without any further orders from her) to stay away from Kakashi. Upon hearing of his desertion, Naruto Uzumaki & Sakura Haruno leave the village to rescue their teacher. Team 8, Team 10 & Team Guy are sent to retrieve them.

Naruto, Sakura & Sai follow Kakashi & defeat Hiruko's subordinates. Eventually, they reach the temple, where Hiruko awaits for Kakashi. Naruto enters the temple alone, where Hiruko starts the eclipse & the absorption. However, Kakashi's  activates, & the space inside the slime created by the Chimera Technique begins to distort. Naruto saves Kakashi, breaking into the slime with multiple  before pulling him out, but Hiruko remains alive. He states that the eclipse continues & releases a large amount of chakra, reducing the surrounding area to rubble. Hiruko summons a chimera beast. Team 8, Team 10 & Team Guy work together to defeat the chimera beast. Naruto & Kakashi battle Hiruko, who easily absorbs their attacks, Raikiri & Oodoma Rasengan. Naruto finally attacks Hiruko with Futon: Rasenshuriken (Wind Release (Wind Style): Rasenshuriken), which Hiruko fails to absorb & dies from his injuries. The ninjas celebrate their victory at Mount Shumi.

After the credits, a note from Masashi Kishimoto says, "I hope this movie stays with you forever..."

Voice cast

Critical reception
Carlo Santos of Anime News Network gave the film a C+ rating. In his review, he commended the film for its fluid action scenes, background art and connections to major plot points from the series but criticized the poor execution of the plot into a conventional Shōnen Jump formula with little complexion, concluding with, "If only the staff had put as much effort into the storytelling as they did for the animation, perhaps this would have come out as a more complete product."

References

External links
  
 Naruto 10th Anniversary site 
 Tv-Tokyo's Naruto site 
 
 

2009 films
2009 anime films
2000s Japanese-language films
Japanese sequel films
Will Of Fire
Toho animated films
Viz Media anime
Films scored by Yasuharu Takanashi